The 2008 Scotties Tournament of Hearts, Canada's national women's curling tournament was held February 16–24, 2008 at the Brandt Centre in Regina, Saskatchewan. The winner was the 2005 champion team from Manitoba, under skip Jennifer Jones. In winning, they became the first team since Kelley Law's rink from B.C. in 2000 to win the championship after playing a tie-breaker game.

Teams

Round robin standings

Results
Times Are Central Standard Time

Draw 1
February 16, 2:30 PM CT

Draw 2

February 16, 7:00 PM CT

Draw 3
February 17, 9:30 AM CT

Draw 4
February 17, 2:00 PM CT

Draw 5
February 17, 7:00 PM CT

Draw 6
February 18, 9:30 AM CT

Draw 7
February 18, 2:00 PM CT

Draw 8
February 18, 7:00 PM CT

Draw 9
February 19, 9:30 AM CT

Draw 10
February 19, 2:00 PM CT

Draw 11
February 19, 7:00 PM CT

Draw 12
February 20, 9:30 AM CT

Draw 13
February 20, 2:00 PM CT

Draw 14
February 20, 7:00 PM CT

Draw 15 
February 21, 9:30 AM CT

Draw 16
February 21, 2:00 PM CT

Draw 17
February 21, 7:00 PM CT

Tie breakers
February 22, 9:30 AM CT

Playoffs

1 vs. 2 
February 22, 2:00 PM CT

3 vs. 4
February 22, 7:00 PM CT

Semi-final
February 23, 10:30 AM CT

Final
February 24, 11:30 AM CT

Top 5 percentages per position, round robin

Playdowns
Names in italics indicate defending provincial champions

Alberta
January 22–26, Peace Memorial Multiplex, Wainwright

(triple elimination until championship round)

A vs. B: Sonnenberg 8-4 Bernard
C vs. C: Kleibrink 6-2 Odegard
Semi-final: Kleibrink 10-5 Bernard 
Final: Kleibrink 7-6 Sonnenberg

British Columbia
January 23–27, Trail Curling Club, Trail

Semi-final: MacInnes 6-4 Recksiedler 
Final: MacInnes 6-5 Maskiewich

Defending champion, Kelley Law did not participate/qualify

Manitoba
January 23–27, Gimli Recreation Centre, Gimli

Red Group

Black Group

Red 1 vs. Black 1: Spencer 9-6 Jones
Red 2 vs. Black 2: Jenion 7-4 Ursel
Semi-final: Jones 10-6 Jenion
Final: Jones 8-5 Spencer

New Brunswick
January 23–27, Thistle St. Andrews Curling Club, Saint John

Semi-final: Robichaud 9-3 Kelly
Final: Robichaud 6-5 Atkinson

Newfoundland and Labrador
January 23–27, Bally Haly Golf and Curling Club, St. John's

Semi-final: Nichols 6-5 Sauder
Final: Strong 9-3 Nichols

Nova Scotia
January 22–27, Halifax Curling Club, Halifax

Tie-breaker: Breen 6-5 Harrison
1 vs. 2: Pinkney 6-5 Arsenault
3 vs. 4: Mattatall 8-7 Breen
Semi-final: Arsenault 6-5 Mattatall
Final: Arsenault 7-6 Pinkney

Defending champion Jill Mouzar is playing third for Harrison

Ontario
 
January 21–27, Espanola Curling Club, Espanola

Tie-breaker: McGhee 9-3 Hanna
1 vs. 2: McCarville 6-5 Middaugh
3 vs. 4: Goring 7-3 McGhee
Semi-final: Middaugh 7-2 Goring
Final: Middaugh 7-6 McCarville

Prince Edward Island
January 18–22, Charlottetown Curling Club, Charlottetown

Triple knock out tournament

Quebec
January 13–20, Club de curling Etchemin, Saint-Romuald

Section A

Section B

Page playoffs
Tie-breaker: Brassard 9-2 Mastine 
A2 vs. B2: Osborne 10-7 Brassard
A1 vs. B1: Larouche 6-5 Bélisle
Semi-final: Bélisle 7-6 Osborne
Final: Larouche 11-8 Bélisle

Saskatchewan
January 23–27, North Battleford Granite Curling Club, North Battleford

Semi-final: Lawton 7-5 Stewart
Final: Englot 5-4 Lawton

Defending champion, Jan Betker did not participate/qualify

Northwest Territories/Yukon
January 24–27 at the Yellowknife Curling Club, Yellowknife

See also
 2008 Brier
 2008 World Men's Curling Championship
 2008 World Junior Curling Championships
 2008 World Mixed Doubles Curling Championship
 2008 Ford World Women's Curling Championship

Notes

References

Sports competitions in Regina, Saskatchewan
Scotties Tournament of Hearts
Scotties Tournament Of Hearts, 2008
Curling in Saskatchewan
Scotties Tournament of Hearts
Scotties Tournament of Hearts
Scotties Tournament of Hearts